
Gmina Orneta is an urban-rural gmina (administrative district) in Lidzbark County, Warmian-Masurian Voivodeship, in northern Poland.

Villages
Apart from the town of Orneta, Gmina Orneta contains the villages and settlements of Augustyny, Bażyny, Biały Dwór, Bogatyńskie, Chwalęcin, Dąbrówka, Drwęczno, Gieduty, Henrykowo, Karbowo, Karkajmy, Klusajny, Krosno, Krzykały, Kumajny, Lejławki Małe, Lejławki Wielkie, Miłkowo, Mingajny, Nowy Dwór, Opin, Osetnik, Ostry Kamień, Wojciechowo and Wola Lipecka.

Neighbouring gminas
Gmina Orneta is bordered by the gminas of Godkowo, Lidzbark Warmiński, Lubomino, Miłakowo, Pieniężno, Płoskinia and Wilczęta.

References
Polish official population figures 2006

Orneta
Lidzbark County